Red green or Red Green may refer to:

Politics
 Eco-socialism, an ideology merging aspects of Marxism, socialism, green politics, ecology and alter-globalization
 Islamo-leftism, a political alliance of leftist (red) and Islamist (green) political movements
 Red-green alliance, an alliance of "red" social democratic or democratic socialist parties with "green" environmentalist parties
 Red-Green Alliance (Denmark), a revolutionary socialist and environmentalist political party in Denmark
 Red-Green Coalition, a centre-left coalition of Norwegian left-wing and environmentalist parties
 Red-Greens (Sweden), a cooperation of red (leftist) and green (environmentalist) political parties in Sweden

People
 Red Green (ice hockey) (1899–1966), Canadian professional ice hockey left winger
 Steve Smith (comedian) (born 1945), Canadian comedian who portrayed his Red Green alterego on The Red Green Show

See also
 Red–green color blindness, the inability to perceive differences between some of the colors that others can distinguish
 The Red Green Show (1991–2006), a Canadian television comedy
 RG color space, a color space that uses only two colors, red and green